Narayana Ninna Namada is a Kannada composition in Carnatic music by Purandara Dasa in the 16th century. It is set in the Shuddha Dhanyasi raga and the Khanda Chapu tala. It emphasizes the value of reciting God's name.

The song is popular and has been performed by many musicians, including M. S. Subbulakshmi, Bombay Jayashri, Sudha Ragunathan, Maharajapuram Santhanam, M. Balamuralikrishna,E. Gayathri, Saindhavi and many others.

Composition 
Pallavi:
 Nārāyaṇa ninna nāmada smaraṇeya
 Sārāmṛtavu enna nāligege barali (Nārāyaṇa…)

Charanam 1:
 Kaṣṭadallirali utkṛṣṭadallirali
 Eṣṭādaru matigeṭṭu irali
 Kṛuṣṇa kṛuṣṇa endu ṣiṣṭaru pēḷuva
 Aṣhṭākṣara mahā-mantrada nāmava (Nārāyaṇa…)

Charanam 2:
 Santata hari ninna sāsira nāmava 
 Antarangada oḷagirisi
 Ento purandara viṭhala rāyana
 Antya kāladalli chintisohānge (Nārāyaṇa…)

Meaning

References

16th-century songs
Carnatic compositions
Kannada-language songs